Puthiya Bhoomi is a 1968 Indian Tamil-language film directed by Chanakya, starring M. G. Ramachandran and Jayalalithaa. It is a remake of the Hindi film Himalay Ki God Mein (1965). The film was released on 27 June 1968.

Plot 

Katheeravan is a cardiologist and heart surgeon, while his father is an honest police officer. Kangeyan is a criminal whose life Katheeravan saves. When Kangeyan learns that his saviour is the son of the police officer who is out to get him, he tries to kill Katheeravan, but without success. Meanwhile, Kangeyan's deputy pulls the brake lines from Katheeravan's car. Katheeravan meets with an accident and ends up in a village where he meets Kannamma. Love arises between them, but the threat of Kangeyan looms over the village and Katheeravan.

Cast 
 M. G. Ramachandran as Katheeravan
 Jayalalithaa as Kannamma
 M. N. Nambiar as Kangeyan
 S. A. Ashokan as Mayandhi
 Nagesh as Sivamani
 T. S. Muthaiah as Veeraiya
 S. Ramarao as Vidapudi Veera Baghu
 Trichy Soundararajan as The Inspector General of Police Officer Ranga Durai
 Pandari Bai as Kathiravan's mother
 Sheela as Nalina
 Rama Prabha as Maari Kannamma's friend

Soundtrack 
The music was composed by M. S. Viswanathan. Lyrics were written by Kannadasan and Poovai Senguttavan.

Reception 
Kalki negatively reviewed the film for lack of originality and newness.

References

Bibliography

External links 

1960s Tamil-language films
1968 films
Films directed by Tapi Chanakya
Films scored by M. S. Viswanathan
Tamil remakes of Hindi films